An adipose tissue neoplasm is a neoplasm derived from adipose tissue.

An example is lipoma.

References

External links 

Connective/soft tissue tumors and sarcomas